Abel Quentin is a French lawyer and writer. His partner is fellow writer, Claire Berest.

Works

Soeur
Published in 2019, Soeur was Quentin's first published novel. About the Islamic radicalisation of a teenager, the novel made the first selection for the Prix Goncourt and won the Prix Première in 2020.

Le voyant d'Étampes
Quentin's second novel is about Jean Roscoff, a retired alcoholic academic who unwittingly finds himself the victim of 'woke politics' following the publication of his book on an obscure American poet. Le voyant d'Étampes has received rave reviews and was considered a 'serious candidate for the Goncourt' by Le Soir. The novel won the Prix de Flore and made it to the second round of the Prix Goncourt as well as the first selection for the Prix Renaudot.

Bibliography
Soeur, Éditions de l'Observatoire, 2019, 
''Le voyant d'Étampes, Éditions de l'Observatoire, 2021,

References

Living people
21st-century French novelists
Year of birth missing (living people)